Masterton West is a suburb of Masterton, a town on New Zealand's North Island.

It includes Renall Street railway station and the Douglas Parks sports group.

Air quality in Masterton West exceeded World Health Organization guidelines for 28 days in 2018 and 34 days in 2019.

Demographics 

Douglas Park had a population of 2,016 at the 2018 New Zealand census, an increase of 111 people (5.8%) since the 2013 census, and an increase of 129 people (6.8%) since the 2006 census. There were 810 households. There were 924 males and 1,092 females, giving a sex ratio of 0.85 males per female. The median age was 44.7 years (compared with 37.4 years nationally), with 408 people (20.2%) aged under 15 years, 336 (16.7%) aged 15 to 29, 801 (39.7%) aged 30 to 64, and 471 (23.4%) aged 65 or older.

Ethnicities were 86.2% European/Pākehā, 17.1% Māori, 4.6% Pacific peoples, 3.0% Asian, and 2.8% other ethnicities (totals add to more than 100% since people could identify with multiple ethnicities).

The proportion of people born overseas was 15.5%, compared with 27.1% nationally.

Although some people objected to giving their religion, 47.9% had no religion, 38.2% were Christian, 0.4% were Hindu, 0.1% were Muslim, 0.4% were Buddhist and 4.3% had other religions.

Of those at least 15 years old, 270 (16.8%) people had a bachelor or higher degree, and 351 (21.8%) people had no formal qualifications. The median income was $26,000, compared with $31,800 nationally. The employment status of those at least 15 was that 678 (42.2%) people were employed full-time, 252 (15.7%) were part-time, and 60 (3.7%) were unemployed.

Education

Masterton West also has a kindergarten.

References

Suburbs of Masterton